Hasselt is a Belgian city and municipality, and capital and largest city of the province of Limburg in the Flemish Region of Belgium. It is known for its former branding as "the city of taste", as well as its local distelleries of Hasselt jenever (gin), the Hasselt Jenever Festivities, Limburgish pie and the Hasselt speculaas. The municipality includes the original city of Hasselt, plus the boroughs of Sint-Lambrechts-Herk, Wimmertingen, Kermt, Spalbeek, Kuringen, Stokrooie, Stevoort and Runkst, as well as the hamlets and parishes of Kiewit, Godsheide and Rapertingen.

On 01 July 2022 Hasselt had a total population of 80,260 (39,288 men and 40,972 women). Both the Demer river and the Albert Canal run through the municipality. Hasselt is located in between the Campine region, north of the Demer river, and the Hesbaye region, to the south. On a larger scale, it is also situated in the Meuse-Rhine Euroregion.

History

Hasselt was founded in approximately the 7th century on the Helbeek, a tributary of the Demer river. During the Middle Ages it became one of the free cities of the county of Loon (which had borders approximately the same as the current province of Limburg). It was first named in a document in 1165. In 1232 Arnold IV, Count of Loon gave the city the freedoms like those enjoyed in Liège. Even though the city of Borgloon was the original capital of Loon, Hasselt was to become the biggest city thanks to its favourable setting, and the proximity of the count's castle at Herkenrode in Kuringen. In 1366 the county of Loon came under the direct rule of the Prince-Bishopric of Liège and remained so until the annexation by France in 1794.

During the First French Empire, after the French revolution, the city of Maastricht became the capital of the French Department of the Lower Meuse. This comprised not only the area of the modern province of Limburg in Belgium, but also what is now the province of Limburg in the Netherlands. After the defeat of Napoleon in 1815, all of what is now Belgium became part of the United Kingdom of the Netherlands. During this time, it was King William I who confusingly re-named the Lower Meuse department after the medieval Duchy of Limburg. That Duchy was in fact named after Limbourg on the Vesdre river, now in the Liège province of Belgium, which had never encompassed Hasselt or Maastricht. Belgium split from the Netherlands in 1830, but the status of Limburg was only resolved nine years later in 1839, with the division of Limburg into Belgian and Dutch parts. Hasselt became the provisional capital of the Belgian province of Limburg. In ecclesiastical terms Belgian Limburg became an independent entity from the Diocese of Liège only in 1967, and Hasselt became the seat of the new Diocese of Hasselt.

Etymology 
The name Hasselt is said to be derived from the Germanic word Hasaluth, meaning hazel forest.

Town centre

The centre is mostly car-free and contains a number of historical buildings. Among the oldest buildings in the town centre are the St. Quentin's Cathedral (11th to 18th centuries) and the "Herkenrode Abbey refuge house" (1542). The Grand Place and the nearby streets are lined with restaurants brasseries, cafes and taverns.

The Demerstraat and the Koning Albertstraat are the most important shopping streets. In the Kapelstraat and the Hoogstraat are expensive shops with the most famous brands. Another major religious building, besides the cathedral, is the Virga Jesse Basilica. The churches must cede domination of the skyline of the city to the modern twin towers of the "TT-wijk", however. In 2003, the renovation of this complex, now including a shopping mall and a hotel, gave the centre a new boost. In 2004, Hasselt was the first city to receive the title "most sociable city of the region of Flanders", and has since claimed the title of "Capital City of Taste".

Demographics
In 1977, Hasselt merged with several surrounding municipalites attaching the current boroughs of Kermt, Kuringen, Sint-Lambrechts-Herk, Stevoort and Wimmertingen and adding 22.309 inhabitans at the time to its 1977 population of 40.446 inhabitants.

Languages
 Dutch in Hasselt is often spoken with a distinctive Limburgish accent, which should not be confused with the Limburgish language.
 Limburgish (or Limburgian) is the overlapping term of the tonal dialects spoken in the Belgian and Dutch provinces of Limburg. The Hasselt dialect is only one of many variants of Limburgish. Although frequently misunderstood as such, Limburgish does not refer to the regional variation of Dutch spoken in Dutch Limburg and Belgian Limburg. Since Limburgish is still the mother tongue of many inhabitants, Limburgish grammar, vocabulary and pronunciations can have a significant impact on the way locals speak Dutch in public life.
French was historically spoken by some of the city population within living memory, but is no longer present in current day-to-day life.

Religion 
Hasselt is the main town of the diocese of Hasselt, which covers the entire Belgian province of Limburg. The main church is the St. Quentin's Cathedral. Hasselt also consists of about 30 parishes. Next to the catholic church, Hasselt houses both a Moroccan and Turkish mosque as both communities are well-established in the city and the surrounding municipalities.

Attractions
 The Abbey and Refugehuis of Herkenrode in Kuringen
 Kiewit Airfield (recreational)
 The Japanese gardens, the largest in Europe
 The National Bank building, by architect Henri Van Dievoet.
 St. Quentin's Cathedral
 The Virga Jesse Basilica
 National Jenever Museum
 The Borrelmantje and the Borrelvrouwtje, referring to the history of Hasselt jenever
 The beguinage
 The old prison of Hasselt, now housing Hasselt University
 Versuz, the biggest club of Belgium
 The Hasselt Fashion Museum
 The Limburgish lavender farm
 Chocolate House Boon
 The Colonel Dusart square
 The House for Contemporary Art, Design & Architecture - Z33
 The World War II landscape remains of Tommelen, known as ‘bommekoëter’ or bomb craters in the local dialect, overlooked by an observation tower
 The Flanders Nippon Golf club, originally built to attract Japanese investors in the 1970s together with the Twin Towers (TT) district

Events
The Virga Jesse festival, featuring a Procession of the historic wooden statue of infant Jesus with Mary, is celebrated every seven years, most recently in August 2010.
The yearly "Jeneverfeesten" celebrate the history of the jenever beverage in Hasselt.
Hasselt celebrates Carnival, but at a slightly different date than most places.
Many events take place in the Ethias Arena, the largest arena in Belgium.
Kiewit is the location of the yearly Pukkelpop (Pimplepop) festival, one of Europe's largest alternative music festivals with over a hundred concerts, at the end of August in the suburb of Kiewit. Rimpelrock (Wrinklerock), a festival with music for an older audience, is held at the same location, one week earlier.
Like in most Belgian cities, there is an annual Kermesse, on a date associated with the local church's patron saint, in this case Saint Lambert, which takes place in September.
The Junior Eurovision Song Contest 2005 was held in Hasselt.
The Grand Prix van Hasselt is a cyclo-cross race held in November which is part of the BPost Bank Trophy.

Gastronomy 
Hasselt brands itself as "the city of taste" and is known for its famous Hasselt gin and speculaas, as well as the Limburgish pie and more recently its chocolate.

Hasseltse jenever (Hasselt gin) 

Hasselt is famous for its gin, locally known as jenever. Even though the spirit is produced across the entire country of Belgium, Hasseltse jenever became famous when the city escaped the 1601 ban on the sale and production of jenever imposed by Albert VII, Archduke of Austria and Isabella Clara Eugenia, both Archduke and Archduchess of the Habsburg Netherlands, because it belonged to the Prince-Bishopric of Liège. Dutch troops stationed in the city from 1675 to 1681 ensured that Hasselt jenever, more than other Belgian jenever, carried aromas of herbs and berries. At the end of the 17th century, jenever production got off to a good start.

At the end of the 19th century, misery among the working population and cheap jenever prepared from sugar beet molasses led to a consumption of 9.5 litres of jenever (50% vol) per inhabitant per year in Belgium. Jenever production was the most important industrial industry in Limburg in the 19th century with most distilleries located in Hasselt. An increase in excise duty, competition from cheap industrial alcohol, the confiscation of copper stills by the Germans during World War I, and the Vandervelde law against alcohol abuse caused most distilleries in Hasselt to disappear or to be taken over by larger competitors.

Apart from the distillery (known as 'stokerij' in Dutch) of the Hasselt National Jenever Museum, Hasselt had one more jenever distillery left in the early 21st century: Stokerij Wissels from 1920. Koen De Jans bought this company in 2005; out of respect for tradition, the name remained unchanged. In 2017, Stokerij Wissels, went bankrupt. Michel Fryns, 4th generation of the Hasselt gin family Fryns, took over Wissels, moving the distillery from the city to the Hasselt industrial estate of Ekkelgaarden under the name Wissels Distillery. In 2018, Michel Fryns and Distillery Bruggeman, located in Ghent, set up the company United Hasselt Distillers to jointly distill jenever in Hasselt. Bruggeman has owned and produced the famous Hasselt gin brand Smeets since 2011 and had owned the 'Fryns' brand name since 1988. When United Hasselt Distillers was founded, it was agreed that the 'Fryns' brand would be transferred back by Bruggeman to Michel Fryns. Wissels Distillery is since then renamed Fryns Distillery.
In 2012, the new distillery 't Stookkot was established in the suburb of Stevoort. In 2017, Stokerij Vanderlinden commenced production in Hasselt.

Hasselt Jenever Festivities 
Every year on the third weekend of October, all Hasselers celebrate their rich tradition at the 2-day Hasselt Jenever Festivities. It is one of the largest and most exuberant city festivals in Belgium. On Saturday, drinks are on the Borrelmanneke who changes from being a water fountain into a jenever fountain for the day. On Sunday the traditional waiter competition is held. Visitors can take part in a jenever walk or take a ride on the jenever tram. During the entire weekend the streets of Hasselt are filled with music (jazz in particular), dance, street theater, exhibitions and a culinary village.

Hasselt speculaas 
Hasselt speculaas is a famous type of speculaas originating and only produced in Hasselt, not to be confused with the brand Speculoos. One of the differences between Hasselt speculaas and the ordinary speculaas is its thickness. In fact, Hasselt speculaas is thicker and less crispy. It also tastes softer and less spicy.

Speculaas was baked in Hasselt as early as the 14th century, but the oldest mention of Hasselt speculaas dates from 1830. Speculaas was baked during the Ten Day's Campaign because of its nutritional value for the soldiers participating in the 1830 Belgian revolution.

Willem Li(e)ben (1754 -1822) was the baker at Herkenrode abbey, married to a chambermaid of the abbess. He learned, probably from a Walloon monastery, the so-called "speculation préparée à la maison" and baked it for the abbess of Herkenrode.

During the occupation by the French in 1796, the abbey was evacuated and Willem settled with his son Christaen (1796 - 1877) at the corner of the Hoogstraat and Aldestraat in Hasselt in the building "De Gulden Poort". People called him "the baker of Herkenrode". Christiaen would later fine-tune the speculaas recipe to "Speculation de Hasselt". The childless Willem Li(e)bens (1844 - 1882), and third generation, taught the recipe to his assistant baker, Louis Dessart, from the Deplée family who had a shop opposite of the Li(e)bens family. Dessart started his own bakery after the death of his master. The Deplée family gave the speculaas a commercial appeal, reaching as far as the United States, but could not patent it as "Hasselt speculaas" because speculaas already existed.

Another theory for the origin of Hasselt speculaas mentions the many gin distilleries in the city, as the gin distilling process produces sugars from which brown sugar is made, a basic ingredient for speculaas.

Initially, Hasselt's speculaas was only baked around the Saint-Nicholas period, but as its consumption soared after World War II, the pastry was eventually sold all year round.

According to tradition, Hasselt speculaas is eaten with well-chilled Hasselt gin.

Economy 

With 3,000 employees, the Jessa Hospital in Hasselt is the city's biggest employer with 2 health care campuses and one logistical campus. Cegeka Group, a European provider of IT solutions, services and consultancy is also one of the city's largest employers generating a turnover of €744 million. The city also provides for a unique ecosystem for start-ups, scale-ups and major companies through its Corda Campus, surrounded by government organizations and research institutions. Currently, 5,000 people work in 250 companies over a land area of 9 acres, formerly being occupied by Philips. By 2030, a planned investment of €150 million  at the site should generate employment for 7,500 people in 350 companies on a lade area of 14 acres.

Transport

Hasselt is at the junction of important traffic arteries from several directions. The most important motorways are the European route E313 (Antwerp-Liège) and the European route E314 (Brussels-Aachen). The old town of Hasselt is enclosed by 2 ring roads. The outer ring road serves to keep traffic out of the city center and main residential areas. The inner ring road, the "Green Boulevard", serves to keep traffic out of the commercial center, which is almost entirely a pedestrian area. There are also important traffic arteries to Tongeren, Sint-Truiden, Genk, and Diest.

The city lies within approximately an hour's drive from the airports of Brussels, Liège, Antwerp, Charleroi, Cologne/Bonn, and Düsseldorf. Within a three-hour radius, the major hubs of Paris and Frankfurt, can be reached. Small private aircraft can land in Hasselt itself, on the airfield of Kiewit.

The city has a major railway station being Hasselt railway station. InterCity trains link the city to major Belgian centres such as Antwerp, Liège, Brussels and Leuven, and also to Belgium's national airport in Zaventem.

Bus

Hasselt made public transport by bus zero-fare from 1 July 1997 and bus use was said to be as much as "13 times higher" by 2006.

In 2013, the subsidies were reduced, resulting in a 60 euro-cents fare per ride.

The plan for a new, attractive bus network in Hasselt was influenced by transport minister Eddy Baldewijns, who created an integrated transport policy framework in the middle of 1996 in which public transport was allocated a primary role.  The city of Hasselt was one of the first cities to subscribe to the plan. Mayor Steve Stevaert proposed to give absolute primacy on the city's Green Boulevard to public transport. The mobility policy in Hasselt developed into an example of cooperation between the bus line, the government and the city of Hasselt, under the motto "the city guarantees the right of mobility for everyone". 

Following the introduction of the new zero-fare policy, the usage of public transport immediately increased by 800–900% and has remained high, being currently more than 10-fold compared to the time of the old policy. The city's official website records passenger growth as follows:

A Belgian website describes Hasselt identity cards as becoming "like gold in value", because of free bus travel.

In 2013, Hasselt cancelled free public transportation due to financial reasons. The operator increased its claim towards the city, which the city could not pay. Now persons up to the age of 19 travel for free.

Rail

Hasselt railway station run by NMBS is near the city centre, outside the innermost "Binnenring". The station is an IC station, which means there are several connections each day with important Belgian cities.

Light rail
In February 2007, a plan was launched for the construction of an international light rail connection between Hasselt and Maastricht (Hasselt – Maastricht tramway). Agreements between the relevant governments were reached in June 2008 and December 2011. The line will reduce the current travel time of 61 minutes by bus to only 36 minutes. Construction should have started in 2014, with the line expected to go into service in 2017. The construction eventually got delayed several times due to problems with the Wilhelminabrug in Maastricht, concerns about the profitability and numbers of passengers making use of the planned line and opposition from the Hasselt city council on the planned route through the city. The Flemish government eventually pulled the plug on the project, with various Dutch governments reporting to have spent more than €20 million without any major construction. The line might now be replaced by a so-called electric "trambus" system. However, concerns were raised too as the new alternative might not fulfill the cross-border high-quality public transport needs of the Dutch and Belgian provinces of Limburg.

Education 

Hasselt has two university colleges: University College PXL and University Colleges Leuven-Limburg (UCLL). These offer courses in healthcare, social work, art, commercial sciences and teacher training, among others.

There is also Hasselt University, with a campuses in Hasselt and the neighbouring town of Diepenbeek. Hasselt University cooperates with Maastricht University, including in the Transnational University Limburg (tUL), and with Eindhoven University of Technology.

In Hasselt, over 22,000 students pursue higher education.

Secondary education in Hasselt attracts students from the entire province and surrounding regions due to the range of study options and available public transport. In 2010, the city council asked schools to spread the starting hours of classes in an attempt to control traffic jams caused by the high number of students in the city. Some fields of study, such as arts, are only offered in Hasselt in Flanders. Some schools in Hasselt are the Institute Mariaburcht, Virga Jessecollege, Kindsheid Jesu, Atheneum Plus, Methodeschool Van Veldeke, Hotelschool KTA3, Topsportscholen MS3 and KA2, Level X, Provinciale Handelsschool, Provinciale Kunsthumaniora PIKOH, Provinciaal Instituut voor verpleegkunde PIVH and Technisch Instituut Heilig Hart. The Provinciale Kunsthumaniora Hasselt is the largest homogeneous secondary art school in Flanders.

Due to the growing expat community in the city and the Belgian province of Limburg, and to further attract foreign companies, the Provincial Development Company of Limburg is researching the possibility of establishing an international school in Hasselt.

Sports
Hasselt is home to Limburg United, one of the country's top professional basketball teams. The team plays its home games in the Sporthal Alverberg.

Famous inhabitants

Charlotte Adigéry, singer, musician (b. 1990)
Guy Bleus, artist (b. 1950, Hasselt)
Bram Castro, footballer (b. 1982)
Willy Claes, politician and former Secretary General of NATO (b. 1938)
Stef Driesen, Antwerp-based artist (b. 1966, Hasselt)
Brecht Evens, Paris-based graphic novellist and illustrator (b. 1986)
Adrien de Gerlache, officer of the Belgian Navy and leader of the Belgian Antarctic Expedition (1866–1934)
Luuk Gruwez, poet (b. 1953)
Daniel Guijo-Velasco, footballer (b. 1984)
Luc Nilis, footballer (b. 1967)
Casper de Norre (born 1997), footballer
Regi Penxten (born 1976), artist, producer 
Axelle Red, singer-songwriter (b. 1968)
Francis Rombouts, Mayor of New York City from 1679 to 1680
Steve Stevaert, politician (1954–2015)
Hendrik van Veldeke, writer of romance, lyric, and hagiography; first vernacular writer in the Low Countries (c. 1140–c. 1190)
Jean-Joseph Thonissen, professor at law (1817–1891)
Max Verstappen, Two-time Formula One Champion (b. 1997, Hasselt)
Laurens Vanthoor, racing driver (b. 1991, Hasselt). 
Dries Vanthoor, racing driver (b. 1998). 
Louis Willems, doctor and one of the pioneers of bacteriology and immunology (b. 1822)
Dana Winner, singer (b. 1965, Hasselt)

Twin and partner cities
: Detmold
: Mountain View, California
: Itami, Hyogo
: Sittard
 Hasselt is a member city of Eurotowns network

See also
Junior Eurovision Song Contest 2005
Speculaas
DV Hasselt

References

External links

 
Municipalities of Limburg (Belgium)
Populated places established in the 7th century
Provincial capitals of Flanders
7th-century establishments in Francia